James Lavelle (born 22 February 1974) is an English electronic musician, record label owner and curator. He founded the Mo'Wax record label in 1992, and has been the only constant member of UNKLE. He directed the 2014 edition of the Meltdown festival on London's South Bank, and curated the 2016 exhibition "Daydreaming with Stanley Kubrick" at Somerset House. He is the subject of 2016 documentary film The Man from Mo'Wax.

Career
Lavelle founded Mo'Wax in 1992. The label was not co-founded by Tim Goldsworthy, as is often reported.

In 1996 Mo' Wax released one of electronic music's most celebrated albums, DJ Shadow's seminal Endtroducing...... Soon after this Lavelle started work on an album with DJ Shadow under the name UNKLE. The resulting release Psyence Fiction featured collaborations with Richard Ashcroft, Mike D, Badly Drawn Boy and Thom Yorke. In 2003, he released a follow-up to Psyence Fiction, titled Never, Never, Land, though this album saw DJ Shadow replaced by Richard File as the second full-time member of UNKLE. It featured collaborations with 3D of Massive Attack and Josh Homme of Queens of the Stone Age among others.

He is a longtime resident at Fabric in London, mixing the inaugural Fabric Live mix album. He has also mixed three DJ mix albums for Global Underground.

He has produced a number of film soundtracks, including Sexy Beast. Also an in demand remixer, he has reworked tracks by Garbage, The Verve, Beck and Massive Attack.

In an August 2006 interview with The Skinny, Lavelle revealed that he was working with Chris Goss and Autolux on the follow-up to Never, Never, Land, entitled War Stories. Of the album's direction, he said "It’s rawer than Psyence Fiction and Never, Never, Land although it’s more in the vein of the traditional singer/songwriter. If the first record was UNKLE does hiphop and the second record was UNKLE does electronic, then this one is like UNKLE does rock, but it’ll hopefully still have its continuity."

Lavelle produced the title track for longtime collaborators Queens of the Stone Age's 2013 album ...Like Clockwork, which reached number one on the Billboard 200 making it the first Queens of the Stone Age album to top the chart in the United States. The album was nominated for three Grammy Awards, including Best Rock Album.

In 2014 he was asked to direct the Meltdown festival, following in the footsteps of David Bowie, Patti Smith and Jarvis Cocker. His lineup included concerts by Joshua Homme, Max Richter, Neneh Cherry, Goldie and Mark Lanegan. The event culminated with a live UNKLE:Redux featuring an guest appearance from former member DJ Shadow.

Lavelle has scored the soundtrack for Danny Boyle's anthology series Trust starring Donald Sutherland and Hilary Swank.

Selected discography

UNKLE
Psyence Fiction (1998)
Never, Never, Land (2003)
Edit Music for a Film: Original Motion Picture Soundtrack Reconstruction (2005)
Self Defence: Never, Never, Land Reconstructed and Bonus Beats (2006)
War Stories (2007)
More Stories (2008)
End Titles... Stories for Film (2008)
Where Did the Night Fall (2010)
The Road: Part I (2017)
The Road: Part II (Lost Highway) (2019)

Mix albums
Cream Live Two – Disc 3 (1996)
Tribal Gathering 96 – Disc 3 (1998)
FabricLive.01 (2001)
GU023 Global Underground, Barcelona (2002)
Do Androids Dream of Electric Beats? (2001)
Do Androids Dream of Essential Beats? (2003)
WWIII – UNKLEsounds vs. U.N.K.L.E. (Bootleg, 2004)
GU026 Global Underground, Romania (2004)
Big Brother is Watching You (Bootleg of Do Androids Dream of Essential Beats) (2005)
GU037 Global Underground, Bangkok (2009)
GU041 Global Underground, Naples (2015)

Quotes
"I became a DJ because I couldn't breakdance and I was no good at graffiti."
"I'm into a whole concept, it's a whole scene. I'm totally involved in it. We cover hip-hop fused music. We want to do this rock hip-hop thing. We are gonna launch a mad hip-hop/thrash fused band, a young Beastie Boys kind of thing. I'm into the total energy of the Beasties and that whole kind of skate thing. I want that energy and total madness surrounding the whole idea."
On Mo' Wax: "We put out 200 records in 4 or 5 years, I don’t think I’d ever be able to do that again. I don’t think I could ever work like that again, it was just insane."

References

Other sources

External links
James Lavelle discography at Discogs
Inspiring interview about James Lavelle's creative journey by SUBvert magazine

English electronic musicians
Club DJs
English DJs
1974 births
Living people
People from Oxford
Electronic dance music DJs